Ratsirakia legendrei is a species of fish in the family Eleotridae endemic to fresh waters of Madagascar. It is the only known member of its genus. It is the only species in the monotypic genus Ratsirakia, the name of which honours Didier Ratsiraka (b. 1933) who was President of Madagascar from 1975-1993 and from 1997-2002 while the specific name refers to the French physician Jean Legendre who discovered the species while serving with French colonial troops in Madagascar.

References

Ratsirakia
Freshwater fish of Madagascar
Monotypic fish genera
Taxa named by Jacques Pellegrin
Fish described in 1919
Taxonomy articles created by Polbot